A wallet gun is a concealed firearm. It is a small handgun covered in leather or cloth in a wallet shape with openings for the barrel and trigger to disguise it as a wallet (at least at first glance).

See also
 Cane gun
 Improvised firearm
 Pen gun
 Swordstick

External links
 Wallet gun found by police in Antwerpen

Firearms